Schwende is a village in Herdwangen-Schönach, Germany.

Villages in Baden-Württemberg